Lestes numidicus is a species of damselfly in the family Lestidae, the spreadwings. Its common names include Algerian spreadwing and late spreadwing. It is thought to be endemic to Algeria, but its range may extend into Tunisia, Morocco, and France.

This species occurs in freshwater wetlands. It retreats to higher altitudes after the breeding season, where it aestivates in cork oak forests.

References

N
Odonata of Africa
Endemic fauna of Algeria
Insects of North Africa
Insects described in 2003
Taxonomy articles created by Polbot